Joël Stéphane Obele Mba (born 16 August 1994) is a Cameroonian footballer.

References

External links

1994 births
Living people
Cameroonian footballers
Association football midfielders
Cameroonian expatriate footballers
Expatriate footballers in Slovenia
Cameroonian expatriate sportspeople in Slovenia
NK Krka players